sitecues is a Web-based (software as a service) solution that builds zoom and speech features into websites. The product enhances accessibility and usability for website visitors who experience visual and print difficulties. The site was launched by Ai Squared, the makers of ZoomText and assistive software. Sitecues serves over 100 customer, among which are several California State Universities, large universities and libraries in the US, as well as some Federal and State government bodies.

Overview
The product provides a badge that appears at the top bar of the browser and can be used by users having visual and print difficulties to zoom/magnify or listen to the selected text when browsing.

Partnerships
In May 2014, Ai Squared, the maker of sitecues and ZoomText, and GW Micro, the creator of Window-Eyes, have merged into one company. The companies joined forces and combined their infrastructure and resources to exploit computer users who are blind or visually impaired.

See also
 Assistive technology service provider

References

Assistive technology